Isabelle Geneviève Marie Anne Gall (9 October 1947 – 7 January 2018), known professionally as France Gall, was a French yé-yé singer. In 1965, aged 17, she won the Eurovision Song Contest for Luxembourg. Between 1973 and 1992, she collaborated with singer-songwriter Michel Berger.

Early years
Gall was born in Paris on 9 October 1947, to a highly musical family. Her father, the lyricist Robert Gall, wrote songs for Édith Piaf and Charles Aznavour. Her mother, Cécile Berthier, was a singer as well and the daughter of Paul Berthier, the co-founder of Les Petits Chanteurs à la Croix de Bois. The only daughter of her family, France had two brothers: Patrice and Philippe. In spring 1963, Robert Gall encouraged his daughter to record songs and send the demos to the music publisher Denis Bourgeois. That July, she auditioned for Bourgeois at the Théâtre des Champs-Élysées in Paris, after which Bourgeois wanted to sign her immediately. France was subsequently signed to Philips.

At the time, Bourgeois was working for the label as artistic director for Serge Gainsbourg and assumed this role for Gall as well. He encouraged her to record four tracks with the French jazz musician, arranger and composer Alain Goraguer.

Early career
The first airplay of France's first single, "Ne sois pas si bête" ("Don't Be So Stupid"), occurred on her 16th birthday. It was released in November and became a hit, selling 200,000 copies. Gainsbourg, who had released several albums and written songs for singers including Michèle Arnaud and Juliette Gréco, was asked by Bourgeois to write songs for Gall. Gainsbourg's "N'écoute pas les idoles" ("Don't listen to the idols") was Gall's second single; it reached the top of the French charts in March 1964 and stayed there for three weeks.

At the same time, Gall made her live debut, opening for Sacha Distel in Belgium. She teamed up with Distel's business manager, Maurice Tézé, a lyricist, which allowed her to create an original repertoire, unlike the majority of her contemporaries who sang adaptations of Anglophone hits. Elaborate orchestrations by Alain Goraguer blended styles, permitting her to navigate between jazz, children's songs, and anything in between. Examples of this mixed-genre style included "Jazz à gogo" (by Alain Goraguer and Robert Gall) and "Mes premières vraies vacances" (by Jacques Datin and Maurice Vidalin). Gall and Gainsbourg's association produced many popular singles, continuing through the summer of 1964 with the hit song "Laisse tomber les filles" ("Leave the girls alone") followed by "Christiansen" by Datin-Vidalin. Gainsbourg also secretly recorded Gall's laughter to use on "", a track on his 1964 album Gainsbourg Percussions.

1965
Having previously resisted, Gall gave in to her managers at the end of 1964 and recorded a single intended for children. The song "Sacré Charlemagne", written by her father, and set to the music of George Liferman, was a hit in 1965, peaking at number one in France and number five in Turkey.

Eurovision

Gall was then selected to represent Luxembourg in the Eurovision Song Contest 1965. From the ten songs proposed to her, she chose Gainsbourg's "Poupée de cire, poupée de son". On 20 March 1965, Gainsbourg, Gall, and Goraguer attended the finals of the song contest in Naples, where the song was "allegedly booed in rehearsals for straying so far from the sort of song usually heard in the Contest at this point."

Although the delivery during the live show may not have been Gall's strongest performance — one critic wrote that Gall's performance was "far from perfect," another noted that her voice was out of tune and her complexion pale, and when Gall called Claude François, her lover at the time, immediately after the performance, he shouted at her, "You sang off key. You were terrible!" — the song impressed the jury and it took the Grand Prix. Success at Eurovision ensured that Gall became even better known outside Europe and she recorded "Poupée de cire, poupée de son" in French, German, Italian and Japanese. There appears to be no English version released by France Gall, although there was an English cover version by the English 1960s star Twinkle.

Summer tour
In 1965, Gall toured France for several months with "Le Grand Cirque de France" ("The Great Circus of France"), a combination of radio show and live circus. Her singles continued to chart successfully, including the Gainsbourg-penned "Attends ou va-t'en" ("Wait for me, or go away") and "Nous ne sommes pas des anges" ("We are not angels"). She also had a hit with the song "L'Amérique" ("America") by Eddy Marnay and Guy Magenta.

Stewart Mason sums up this early period of Gall's career, culminating in the Eurovision win:[A]lthough many dismissed Gall as a Francophone Lesley Gore, making fluffy and ultra-commercial pop hits with little substance, Gall's hits from this era stand up far better than most. Only Françoise Hardy was consistently making records up to these standards during this era. Though Gall's high, breathy voice was admittedly somewhat limited, she made the most of it. Even dopey hits like "Sacré Charlemagne", a duet with a pair of puppets who were the stars of a children's show on French TV, have an infectious, zesty charm; meatier tunes, like the sultry jazz-tinged ballad "Pense a Moi" and the brilliant rocker "Laisse tomber les filles", were as good as any single produced in the U.S. or Great Britain at the time.

Film opportunities
After a TV film directed by Jean-Christophe Averty and dedicated to the songs of Gall was distributed in the United States in 1965, Gall was sought by Walt Disney to appear as Alice in a musical film version of Alice in Wonderland, after having already made  Alice into a cartoon in 1951. Although Gall had insisted she did not want to become involved in film work, this was the only project which appealed to her. The project was cancelled after Disney's death in 1966.

In 1966, Gall appeared in the television film Viva Morandi, made in the same psychoanalytical mould as the (1965) Federico Fellini film Giulietta degli Spiriti (Juliet of the Spirits). She played "La Grâce" alongside Christine Lebail, who played "La Pureté", both singing "Les Sucettes" in a segment which was prominently labelled "Fantasy", in a clear reference to the song's sexual undertones. 

In 1993, she considered appearing on screen for a cinematographic collaboration with her best friend, screenwriter Telsche Boorman. This planned project was never completed due to Boorman's death in 1996.

In January 2010, Gall was portrayed by Sara Forestier in a feature film released in France, Gainsbourg (Vie héroïque), based on the graphic novel by writer-director Joann Sfar.

1966
In 1966, her children's song "Les Leçons particulières" ("Private lessons") was the subject of public notoriety and displeasure; the same occurred when Jean-Christophe Averty choreographed a troupe of men on all fours to illustrate another of her children's songs, "J'ai retrouvé mon chien" ("I've found my dog"), on his television programme, Les Raisins verts.

Also in 1966, Gall released another successful song written by Gainsbourg called “Les sucettes” (Lollipops). Though the song was superficially about a young girl, Annie, who likes aniseed flavoured lollipops, plays on words within the song revealed it to be about oral sex.<ref name="European">"SPOTLIGHT THIS WEEK: France Gall", The New European, 18 January 2018</ref> Gall was only 18 at the time the song was released and maintained that she was ignorant about the song's double entendre. She said she had sung “with an innocence of which I’m proud” and later said that her humiliation led her to avoid going out in public after being “betrayed by the adults around me”. She then refused to sing the song afterwards. She left France for a tour in Japan shortly after the song was released and was reportedly not able to trust another producer again until meeting Michel Berger.

Psychedelic era and transition to adulthood
At the beginning of 1967, Gall sang a duet with Maurice Biraud, "La Petite", which describes a young girl coveted by a friend of her father. The controversy over this performance overshadowed her release that year of Gainsbourg's poetic Néfertiti. Her next single was recorded with the orchestration of the English composer David Whitaker. They wrote "Bébé requin" ("Baby Shark"), a song which was a success for Gall at the end of 1967, her last one for 6 years .

This was followed by "Teenie Weenie Boppie", an anti-LSD song by Gainsbourg, which has been described as "a bizarre tune about a deadly LSD trip that somehow involves Mick Jagger". Gainsbourg then sang an anti-capital punishment song with Gall, "Qui se souvient de Caryl Chessman?" ("Anyone remember Caryl Chessman?"), about the death row prisoner.

Stewart Mason wrote about this period, "The psychedelic era found Gall, under Gainsbourg's guidance, singing increasingly strange songs ... set to some of Gainsbourg's most out-there arrangements."
Her next record "C'est toi que je veux", again with Whitaker, also failed to make an impact. With this string of recordings in the late 1960s, none of them an unmitigated success, and making the transition from teenage to adult performer, Gall faced some challenges in this period through the early 1970s. Mason wrote,No longer a teenager, but without a new persona to redefine herself with, (and without the help of Gainsbourg, whose time was taken by his own albums and those of his wife Jane Birkin), Gall floundered both commercially and artistically. A label change from Philips to BASF in 1972 didn't help matters ..."

German-language career

Although struggling in her home country, Gall regularly recorded in Germany from 1966 to 1972, in particular with the composer and orchestrator Werner Müller. She had a successful German career with songs by Horst Buchholz and Giorgio Moroder: "Love, l'amour und Liebe" (1967), "Hippie, hippie" (1968), "Ich liebe dich, so wie du bist" ("I love you the way you are") (1969) and "Mein Herz kann man nicht kaufen" ("My heart is not for sale") (1970). Her other German hits included "Haifischbaby (Bébé requin)", "Die schönste Musik, die es gibt" ("The most beautiful music there is"/"Music To Watch Girls By"), "Was will ein Boy" ("What does a boy want?") (1967), "Ja, ich sing" ("Yes, I sing"), "A Banda (Zwei Apfelsinen im Haar)" ("Two oranges in my hair"), "Der Computer Nr. 3" (1968), "Ein bisschen Goethe, ein bisschen Bonaparte" ("A bit of Goethe, a bit of Bonaparte"), "I like Mozart" (1969), "Dann schon eher der Piano player" ("I prefer the piano player") (1970), "Ali Baba Und Die 40 Räuber" ("Ali Baba and the 40 Thieves") (1971), "Komm mit mir nach Bahia, Miguel" ("Come with me to Bahia, Miguel") (1972).

Post-Gainsbourg career
New label, new beginnings
Gall had several other releases in France in 1968, none of which aroused any great interest. At the end of 1968, on reaching the age of 21, Gall separated from Denis Bourgeois and spread her wings upon the expiration of her contract with Philips. She moved to a new record label, La Compagnie, in 1969, with whom her father Robert signed a contract, where she made a number of recordings, but did not succeed in finding a coherent style with Norbert Saada as artistic director.

She went her own way in 1969 with two adaptations: one Italian and the other British: "L'Orage/La Pioggia)" ("The Storm") which she sang with Gigliola Cinquetti at the 1969 Sanremo Music Festival, and "Les Années folles" ("Gentlemen Please"), created by Barbara Ruskin. Her songs "Des gens bien élevés", "La Manille et la révolution", "Zozoï" and "Éléphants" were largely ignored. La Compagnie went bankrupt within three years of its creation, co-founder and singer Hugues Aufray blaming the failure entirely on Norbert Saada.

The early seventies continued to be a barren period for Gall. Although she was the first artist to be recorded in France for Atlantic Records in 1971, her singles "C'est cela l'amour" (1971) and "Chasse neige" (1971), faltered in the charts. In 1972, Gall, for the last time, recorded songs by Gainsbourg, "Frankenstein" and "Les Petits ballons", but these also failed to chart. The results of her collaboration with Jean-Michel Rivat as artistic director, "La Quatrieme chose" (1972), "Par plaisir" and "Plus haut que moi" (1973) all failed to meet with commercial success.
From the 1970s onwards, Gall started regularly visiting Senegal. She bought a hideaway there on the island of N'Gor, close to Dakar in 1990.

Collaboration with Michel Berger
Gall was enthralled by Michel Berger's music when she heard his song "Attends-moi" ("Wait for Me") one day in 1973. During a later radio broadcast, she asked him for his opinion on songs which her then producer wanted her to record. Although he was disconcerted by the quality of the songs, there would be no question of collaboration.

Only six months later, in 1974, after she sang vocals on the song "Mon fils rira du rock'n'roll" on Berger's new album, Gall's publisher asked him, at her behest, to write for her. Gall had already made her mind up that "It will be him and nobody else". In 1974, "La Déclaration d'amour" was to be the first in a long line of hits which marked a turning point in Gall's career. Meanwhile, the two artists had fallen in love and married on 22 June 1976, the only marriage for both. After they married, Gall only sang songs written by Berger until his death in 1992.

Musicals
In 1978, pushed by Berger, she once again trod the boards of the Théâtre des Champs-Élysées, where she had auditioned 15 years earlier, starring in a show titled Made in France. The most novel aspect of this show was that, except for the Brazilian drag act Les Étoiles, the members of the orchestra, choir and the dance troupe were exclusively female. In this show, France sang "Maria vai com as outras" the original, Brazilian (Portuguese) version of "Plus haut que moi".

In 1979, Gall took part in a new show which remains memorable for many. Composed by Michel Berger and written by the Québécois author Luc Plamondon, the rock opera Starmania enjoyed a success not usual for musicals in France. The show played for one month at the Palais des congrès de Paris. In 1982, Gall rehearsed in the Palais des Sports of Paris to present Tout pour la musique, an innovative spectacle marked by its use of electronic music. The songs "Résiste" and "Il jouait du piano debout" ("He played the piano standing") quickly became French pop standards.

1980s and humanitarian projects
In 1985, Gall joined Chanteurs Sans Frontières, on the initiative of Valérie Lagrange. She also worked for S.O.S Éthiopie for the benefit of Ethiopia under the aegis of Renaud. At the same time, she gave a successful series of concerts lasting three weeks at the new venue Le Zénith in Paris, where she performed new songs like "Débranche" ("Loosen-up"), "Hong-Kong Star", and gave solid acoustic performances of "Plus haut", "Diego libre dans sa tête" and "Cézanne peint".

On 14 January 1986, during a trip to Africa, Balavoine died in a helicopter crash. In 1987, the song "Évidemment", written by Berger and sung by Gall, was a moving homage to their lost friend. The song appeared on the album Babacar.

On the same album, the song "Babacar" was about a child Gall and Berger had thought about adopting from Dakar, Senegal after meeting a mother who had begged Gall to take her child.  Instead of adopting the child Berger and Gall decided to help financially by writing a song about the dilemma and donating the proceeds of the song to the child. The costs covered an apartment for the family and paid study costs for both the mother and child.

Gall topped the pop charts in many countries in 1987 and 1988 with another song from the Babacar album, "Ella, elle l'a" ("Ella′s got it"), a Berger tribute to Ella Fitzgerald. Following the release of Babacar, Gall launched a new show produced by Berger. Opening at Le Zénith, the successful production toured throughout Europe, and gave rise to the live album Le Tour de France '88.

1990s and later

Gall took a break from singing in the early 1990s and did not record any more for several years to come. She did, however, make an album called Double Jeu with Berger released 12 June 1992. Following the release of Double Jeu, Gall and Berger announced a series of concerts in various Parisian venues; this project was nearly cancelled by Berger's death from a heart attack on 2 August 1992. Although Gall was strongly affected by Berger's death, she wanted to complete the project they had planned. She decided to commit to the performances at Bercy and promoted the songs that she and Berger had created together.

She finally performed at the Bercy in September. All the songs she performed were written by Michel Berger from Double Jeu, and from their discographies. A year later, she went back on stage and performed in a new show in the Salle Pleyel in Paris featuring new musicians. The repertoire featured songs written exclusively by Berger, though Gall included her own versions of songs originally performed by others.

In 1996, Gall asked Jean-Luc Godard to produce the video clip of her song "Plus haut", taken from her album France. Godard initially refused, but later agreed, and directed a dreamy, picturesque video titled "Plus Oh!" near his residence in Rolle, Switzerland. It was given its first and only airing (due to copyright issues) on 20 April 1996 on the French television channel M6.

After a year in Los Angeles, she released her eighth studio album, France, in 1996. That same year, she decided to headline at the Paris Olympia. The next year, in 1997, she announced her retirement and recorded an unplugged show for French television showcasing songs from her final album.

Personal life
Gall married her collaborator and songwriter, Michel Berger, on 22 June 1976. They had two children together, Pauline and Raphaël.

Her daughter Pauline was diagnosed with cystic fibrosis soon after she was born. She and Berger had decided to focus their hopes on the progress of medical research and to keep details of Pauline's condition a secret from the public. She entered into a pact with her husband to alternate their professional projects to take care of their daughter in the hope that a cure would be found.

Michel Berger died of a heart attack in 1992, at age 44. In April 1993 Gall was diagnosed with breast cancer, which was successfully treated.

Pauline died in December 1997. Following the death of her daughter, Gall made only occasional public appearances.

She was a patron of the French charity Cœurs de Femmes and a regular poker player up until her death.

Death and legacy

As a farewell to her career, a documentary movie was shot in 2001, France Gall par France Gall and millions watched the documentary when it was broadcast on French television that year. She staged and appeared in the 2007 France 2 documentary, Tous pour la musique, marking the 15th anniversary of Michel Berger's death.

A long-term breast cancer survivor, Gall died, aged 70, of an infection after a two-year battle with a cancer of undisclosed primary origin, at the American Hospital of Paris in Neuilly-sur-Seine on 7 January 2018. 

She was buried with her husband and daughter on 20 Avenue Rachel (division 29) at Montmartre Cemetery in Paris.

Discography
Albums

 N'écoute pas les idoles (March 1964)
 France Gall (Mes premières vraies vacances) (August 1964)
 Sacré Charlemagne (December 1964)
 Poupée de cire, poupée de son (April 1965)
 Baby pop (October 1966)
 Les Sucettes (November 1966)
 1968 (January 1968)
 France Gall (1973)
 Cinq minutes d'amour (1976)
 France Gall (6 January 1976)
 Dancing Disco (27 April 1977)
 France Gall Live (live album, 9 November 1978)
 Starmania (various artists) (16 October 1978)
 Paris, France (19 May 1980)
 Tout pour la musique (10 December 1981)
 Palais des Sports (live album, 4 November 1982)
 Débranche! (2 April 1984)
 France Gall au Zénith (live album, 4 February 1985)
 Babacar (19 February 1987)
 Le Tour de France 88 (live album, 7 November 1988)
 Double jeu (with Michel Berger, 12 June 1992)
 Simple je – Débranchée à Bercy (live album, 29 October 1993)
 Simple je – Rebranchée à Bercy (live album, 28 January 1994)
 Pleyel (live album, concert recorded in 1994, published in December 2005)
 France (29 March 1996)
 Concert public (live, Olympia 1996) & Concert privé (Concert acoustique TV M6 1997) (24 April 1997)
 Best of France Gall (compilation, 15 June 2004)
 Évidemment'' (compilation, 7 October 2004)

Singles

 9 October 1963 — "Ne sois pas si bête", adaptation by Pierre Delanoë of "Stand a little closer", original words and music by Jack Wolf and Maurice "Bugs" Bower
 1964 — "N'écoute pas les idoles", words and music by Gainsbourg
 1964 — "Jazz à gogo", words by Robert Gall music by Alain Goraguer
 1964 — "Laisse tomber les filles", words and music by Gainsbourg
 1964 — "Sacré Charlemagne", words by Robert Gall and music by Georges Liferman
 1965 — "Poupée de cire, poupée de son", words and music by Gainsbourg
 1965 — "Attends ou va-t'en", words and music by Gainsbourg
 1965 — "Nous ne sommes pas des anges", words and music by Gainsbourg
 1965 — "Baby pop", words and music by Gainsbourg
 1966 — "Les Sucettes", words and music by Gainsbourg
 1967 — "Néfertiti", words and music by Gainsbourg
 1967 — "Bébé requin", words by Jean-Michel Rivat and Frank Thomas, music by Joe Dassin
 1967 — "Toi que je veux", words by Jean-Michel Rivat and Frank Thomas, music by Joe Dassin
 1968 — "Le Temps du tempo", words by Robert Gall and music by Alain Goraguer
 1968 — "Y'a du soleil à vendre", words by Robert Gall and music by Hubert Giraud
 1968 — "24 / 36", words by Jean-Michel Rivat and Frank Thomas, music by Joe Dassin
 1969 — "Homme tout petit", words by Jean-Michel Rivat and Frank Thomas, music by Jean-Pierre Bourtayre
 1969 — "Les Années folles", adaptation by Boris Bergman of the British song "Gentlemen Please", original words and music by Barbara Ruskin
 1969 — "Baci, baci, baci", adaptation by Eddy Marnay from Italian lyrics by Sergio Bardotti and Claudio Tallino and music by Franco and Giorgio Bracardi
 1970 — "Zozoï", words by Robert Gall and music by Nelson Angelo
 1970 — "Les Éléphants", words by Jean Schmitt and music by Jean Géral
 1971 — "C'est cela l'amour", words by Jacques Lanzmann and music by Paul-Jean Borowsky
 1971 — "Chasse neige", words by Étienne Roda-Gil and music by Julien Clerc
 1972 — "Frankenstein", words and music by Gainsbourg
 1972 — "5 minutes d'amour", words by Jean-Michel Rivat and Frank Thomas, music by Roland Vincent
 1973 — "Plus haut que moi", adaptation by Yves Dessca and Jean-Michel Rivat of "Maria vai com as outras" by Toquinho and Vinicius de Moraes
 1973 — "Par Plaisir", words by Yves Dessca and Jean-Michel Rivat, music by Roland Vincent
 May 1974 — "La Déclaration d'amour", words and music by Michel Hamburger (Michel Berger)
 October 1974 — "Mais, aime la", words and music by Berger
 1975 — "Comment lui dire", words and music by Berger
 April 1976 — "Ce soir je ne dors pas"
 June 1976 — " Ça balance pas mal à Paris" (duet with Michel Berger), words and music by Berger
 May 1977 — "Musique", words and music by Berger
 October 1977 — "Si, maman si"
 January 1978 — "Le meilleur de soi-même"
 March 1978 — "Viens je t'emmène", words and music by Berger
 January 1979 — "Besoin d'amour", words by Luc Plamondon and music by Berger
 June 1980 — "Il jouait du piano debout", words and music by Berger
 October 1980 — "Bébé, comme la vie", words and music by Berger
 October 1980 — "Donner pour donner" (duet with Elton John), words by Michel Berger and Bernie Taupin, music by Michel Berger — Archives INA : Reportage Antenne 2, 1981
 1981 — "Tout pour la musique", words and music by Berger
 1981 — "Résiste", words and music by Berger
 May 1981 — "Amor También", words and music by Berger
 6 April 1984 — "Débranche", words and music by Berger
 17 September 1984 — "Hong Kong Star", words and music by Berger — Archives INA : Extrait de "Hong Kong Star", Antenne 2, 1984 FR No. 6
 4 February 1984 — "Calypso", words and music by Berger
 20 May 1984 — "Cézanne peint", words and music by Berger
 3 April 1987 — "Babacar", words and music by Berger FR No. 11 GER No. 14
 24 August 1987 — "Ella, elle l'a", words and music by Berger FR No. 2 GER No. 1 NL No. 38
 7 March 1988 — "Évidemment", words and music by Berger
 12 September 1988 — "Papillon de nuit", words and music by Berger
 20 March 1989 — "La chanson d'Azima"
 29 May 1992 — "Laissez passez les rêves", words and music by Berger, duet with Michel Berger
 12 October 1992 — "Superficiel et léger"
 15 January 1993 — "Les élans du coeur"
 6 May 1993 — "Mademoiselle Chang" (live)
 5 November 1993 — "Si, maman si" (live)
 December 1993 — "Il jouait du piano debout" (live)
 2 February 1994 — "La négresse blonde" (live)
 15 March 1994 — "Paradis Blanc" (live)
 14 November 1994 — "Les princes des villes"
 15 March 1996 — "Plus haut"
 5 November 1996 — "Privée d'amour"
 25 October 1996 — "Message personnel"
 14 February 1997 — "Résiste" (remix)
 15 May 1997 — "Attends ou va-t'en" (live)
 2004 — "Zozoï" — Reissue of 1970 single
 20 August 2004 — "La seule chose qui compte"

References

External links

 Clips from INA archives
 Official website managed by WEA Music (offline)
 France Gall biography on RFI (offline)
 A Tribute to Gainsbourg: France Gall (offline)
 French forum of France Gall & Michel Berger

Yé-yé singers
1947 births
2018 deaths
Singers from Paris
French child singers
German-language singers
Eurovision Song Contest winners
Eurovision Song Contest entrants for Luxembourg
Eurovision Song Contest entrants of 1965
Philips Records artists
French poker players
French women pop singers
Deaths from cancer in France
Burials at Montmartre Cemetery
Chevaliers of the Légion d'honneur
20th-century French women singers